Here is a list of songs by the Korean girl group Sistar.

A

B

C

D

F

G

H

I

L

M

N

O

P

S

T

U

W

Y

See also
 Sistar discography
 List of awards and nominations received by Sistar

 
Sistar